The Richmond Open was a golf tournament on the LPGA Tour in 1951, 1952, and 1955. It was played at the Richmond Golf Club in Richmond, California.

Winners
1955 Betty Jameson
1953-54 No tournament
1952 Patty Berg
1951 Babe Zaharias

References

Former LPGA Tour events
Golf in California
Women's sports in California